Foreign Literature Committee, or Kominolit, was an interdepartmental committee under the People's Commissariat for Education for the purchase and distribution of foreign literature in Soviet Russia. Its chairman as of October 1921 was Otto Yulyevich Schmidt.

References

Government of the Soviet Union
Soviet literature